The 13th Scroll is the first album by American avant-garde metal band Cobra Strike, released in 1999. In addition to lead member Buckethead, the album features drums by Pinchface, with additional drum programming by Bryan "Brain" Mantia and DJ Disk. On the right of artwork is shown Ultraman Hayata, a character of Ultraman,  a popular 1966 Japanese Tokusatsu TV show.

The term "cobra strike" was inspired by the video game G.I. Joe: Cobra Strike (1983). Artwork for the second album features cobras as seen in the game.

Track listing

Personnel

Musicians
 Buckethead – guitars, bass, production
 Pinchface – drums
 Bryan "Brain" Mantia – programming
 DJ Disk – programming

Additional personnel
 Travis Dickerson – production, engineering
 Jerry Mano – production
 Infared Otis – executive production
 Shinya Takamura – artwork

References

Further reading

 
 
 
 

1999 debut albums